The 2019 Invercargill mayoral election was part of the New Zealand local elections that were held on 12 October 2019 to elect the Mayor of Invercargill. Incumbent mayor Tim Shadbolt was re-elected to his ninth term with a reduced majority.

Key dates
Key dates for the election were:

1 July: Electoral Commission enrolment campaign starts.
19 July: Nominations open for candidates. Rolls open for inspection.
16 August: Nominations close at noon. Rolls close.
21 August: Election date and candidates' names announced.
20 to 25 September: Voting documents delivered to households. Electors can post the documents back to electoral officers as soon as they have voted.
12 October: Polling day. Voting documents must be at the council before voting closes at noon. Preliminary results will be available as soon as all ordinary votes are counted.
17 to 23 October: Official results, including all valid ordinary and special votes, declared.

Candidates

Declared candidates
Rebecca Amundsen, incumbent Deputy Mayor of Invercargill
Steve Chernishov, candidate for city council in 2016
Darren Ludlow, Invercargill City Councillor and former Deputy Mayor of Invercargill
Tim Shadbolt, incumbent Mayor of Invercargill

Rejected candidates
Ria Bond, former New Zealand First list MP

Withdrawn candidates
Toni Biddle, Invercargill City Councillor

Declined to be candidates
Paddy O'Brien, ILT board member and former international rugby union referee

Results
The following table gives the election results:

References

2019 elections in New Zealand
Mayoral elections in Invercargill
October 2019 events in New Zealand